John D McGinnis (born February 3, 1954) was a Republican member of the Pennsylvania House of Representatives. He represented the 79th District, based in Altoona, from 2012 to 2018.

McGinnis was born in Latrobe, Pennsylvania, but moved to Montgomery County in suburban Philadelphia in his youth. He earned a B.A. from the University of Notre Dame and began his professional career as a Catholic school teacher. He later earned an M.S. in business administration at Indiana University South Bend. McGinnis received a Ph.D. in finance from Penn State University in 1993. He later served as a business and finance professor at Penn State Altoona, where he was tenured as associate professor of finance in 2003 and retired from Penn State in 2014. He also had earned both the CFA and CFP professional credentials.

References

External links
Pennsylvania House of Representatives Biography
Web Site Biography

Living people
Republican Party members of the Pennsylvania House of Representatives
1954 births
21st-century American politicians
University of Notre Dame alumni
CFA charterholders
Indiana University alumni
Smeal College of Business alumni